Giacomo Cordelli was an Italian painter, active circa 1600–1620.

Biography
He was born in Viterbo, and is known for the lunette frescoes, depicting old-testament subjects, in the choir adjacent to the Augustinian church of the Santissimi Trinita in the town. The style is a late-mannerist style, somewhat crude and recalling the style of painting used on maiolica. The subjects include:
Samson drinks from the jawbone of an ass
Into the Philistine grain fields, Samson releases the jackals (or wolves) with flames tied to their tails
Samson carries away the portals of Gaza 
Shadrach, Meshach, and Abednego in the Furnace 
Habakkuk, transported by the angel, brings food to Daniel in the lion's den 
 Abraham and the three angels

The frescoes depicting the life of Saint Augustine were painted by Marzio Ganassini. Some sources attribute to him engineering works.

References

1500s births
1600s deaths
People from Lazio
17th-century Italian painters
Italian male painters